Aristolochia lindneri is a species of perennial plant in the family Aristolochiaceae. It is found in Santa Cruz, Bolivia.

References

External links

lindneri
Taxa named by Alwin Berger